Patricia Jean Adam-Smith,  (31 May 1924 – 20 September 2001) was an Australian author, historian and servicewoman. She was a prolific writer on a range of subjects covering history, folklore and the preservation of national traditions, and wrote a two-part autobiography. Her other notable works include The Anzacs (1978), Australian Women at War (1984) and Prisoners of War (1992).

Life
Born out of wedlock, Patricia Jean Smith was adopted by railway workers, her mother a station-mistress and her father a fettler. She lived in a number of small Victorian country towns and was educated at small country schools. She enlisted as a nursing Voluntary Aid Detachment (VAD) during the Second World War, serving from 17 March 1943 to 14 July 1944. Later, she was the first female to be articled as a radio officer when she worked on an Australian merchant ship from 1954 to 1960. She then lived in Hobart, Tasmania, from 1960 to 1967, where she worked as an Adult Education Officer. In 1970, she took the position of Manuscripts Field Officer for the State Library of Victoria, a job she held until 1982.

From 1976 to 2001, Adam-Smith was a member of the Board of Directors for the Royal Humane Society Australasia, and from 1983 to 2001 she was a Committee Member of the Museum of Victoria. Her appointment as an Officer of the Order of Australia in 1994 was made in recognition of her service to community history, particularly through the preservation of national traditions and folklore and the recording of oral histories.

While her main study of and work in oral history was carried out in Australia, Ireland, England and the United States, Adam-Smith's research took her to over 60 countries.

Literary career
Adam-Smith wrote on a wide range of subjects, but her deepest interest was Australian railways. She contributed actively to Australia's literary community, and in 1973 she was State President of Australian Writers in Victoria and the Federal President of the Fellowship of Australian Writers.

In 1978 her book The Anzacs shared The Age Book of the Year Award and was made into a 13-part TV series.

Her autobiography was published in two parts: Hear The Train Blow and the award-winning Good-bye Girlie.

Awards
 1978: The Age Book of the Year Award for The Anzacs
 1980: Appointed Officer of the Order of the British Empire
 1993: Order of Australian Association Book Prize for Prisoners of War
 1994: Awarded an Officer of the Order of Australia
 1995: Audiobook of the Year, Benalla Award, for Good-bye Girlie
 1995: TDK Australian Audio Book Awards, Unabridged Non-Fiction Category, for Good-bye Girlie

Bibliography
 Hear the Train Blow: An Australian Childhood, Ure Smith, 1964
 Moonbird People, Rigby, 1965
 There was a Ship, Rigby, 1967
 Hobart Sketchbook (with drawing by Max Angus), Rigby, 1968
 Tiger Country, Rigby, 1968
 The Rails Go Westward, Macmillan of Australia, 1969
 Folklore of the Australian Railwaymen (collected and edited), Macmillan of Australia, 1969
 No Tribesman, Rigby, 1971
 Across Australia by Indian-Pacific, Thomas Nelson, c1971
 The Barcoo Salute, Rigby, 1973
 Launceston Sketchbook (with drawing by Arthur Phillips), Rigby, 1973
 Romance of Australian Railways, Rigby, 1973
 The Desert Railway, Rigby, 1974
 Neon Signs to the Mutes: Poetry by Young Australians (ed. with Michael Dugan and J.S. Hamilton), Fellowship of Australian Writers and BHP,1976
 Footloose in Australia, Rigby, 1977
 Historic Tasmania Sketchbook (with text by Joan Woodberry, and drawings by Max Angus, Frank Mather and Arthur Phillips), Rigby, 1977
 Port Arthur Sketchbook (with drawings by Arthur Phillips), Rigby, 1977
 Tasmania Sketchbook (with drawing by Max Angus), Rigby, Adelaide, 1977
 Trader to the Islanders (originally published as There was a Ship), Rigby, 1977
 The ANZACS, Thomas Nelson (Australia), 1978
 Islands of Bass Strait (with photographs by John Powell), Rigby, 1978
 Victorian and Edwardian Melbourne from Old Photographs, John Ferguson, 1979
 Romance of Victorian railways, Rigby, 1980
 Hear the Train Blow: Patsy Adam-Smith's Classic Autobiography of Growing Up in the Bush, Nelson, 1981
 Outback Heroes, Lansdowne Press, 1981
 The Shearers, Nelson, 1982
 When We Rode the Rails, Lansdowne, 1983
 Australian Women at War, Nelson, 1984
 Heart of Exile: Ireland, 1848, and the Seven Patriots Banished..., Nelson, 1986
 Australia: Beyond the Dream-time, William Heinemann Australia, 1987
 Prisoners of War, Viking,1992
 Trains of Australia: All Aboard, Australia Post, c1993,
 Goodbye Girlie, Viking, 1994

See also
 Australian outback literature of the 20th century

Notes

References
 Adelaide, Debra (1986) Australian Women Writers: A Bibliographic Guide, London, Pandora
 Australian Women Biographical Entry
 Price, Jenna (1994) "When the spirit is willing, write about it", The Canberra Times, 12 November 1994

External links 

 Patsy Adam-Smith interviewed by Hazel de Berg in the Hazel de Berg collection – audio recording

1924 births
2001 deaths
Officers of the Order of Australia
Australian Officers of the Order of the British Empire
Historians of Australia
Australian autobiographers
Australian women historians
Women autobiographers
20th-century Australian historians
20th-century Australian women writers